Meinersen is a municipality in the district of Gifhorn, in Lower Saxony, Germany. It is situated between the rivers Oker and Aller, approx. 12 km west of Gifhorn, and 25 km southeast of Celle. The Municipality Meinersen includes the villages of Ahnsen, Böckelse, Hardesse, Höfen, Hünenberg, Meinersen, Ohof, Päse, Seershausen, Siedersdamm and Warmse.

Meinersen is also the seat of the Samtgemeinde Meinersen ("collective municipality"), which consists of the following municipalities:

Hillerse
Leiferde
Meinersen
Müden (Aller)

References

Gifhorn (district)